The North American Tour 2013  was a  co-headlining concert tour by American recording artists Pitbull and Kesha. The tour promoted both Pitbull's album Global Warming and Kesha's album Warrior, which were both released in November 2012. Both Kesha and Pitbull officially announced the trek around North America on Friday, March 22, 2013. Although the tour's official name is the North American Tour, Pitbull and Kesha announced on August 5, 2013 that they are bringing the tour to Australia in late October and early November. The tour started on May 23, 2013 in Boston at the Comcast Center and came to a close on June 26, 2013 in Tampa, Florida at the Live Nation Amphitheatre.

Background and development
Back in 2009, Kesha collaborated with Pitbull on a song called "Girls" which featured on his album Pitbull Starring in Rebelution. The two also paired up in 2009 for a remix of Kesha's first single, "Tik Tok". Since then both artists have released multiple albums including Pitbull's Global Warming and Kesha's Warrior that have each hit the top ten of Billboard 200. Pitbull and Kesha each have achieved many top ten hits on Billboard Hot 100 including each of their smash hit singles "Feel This Moment" (Pitbull) and "Die Young" (Kesha). Although the tour was officially announced on March 22, 2013, Kesha and Pitbull hinted at the joint tour on March 21, 2013 via Twitter. The conversation started when Pitbull tweeted to Kesha about the upcoming Kids Choice Awards, which they were both performing at, but separately. Pitbull asked "Oye Mamita @keshasuxx ! u ready 2 party at the #kidschoiceawards this weekend?" Then Kesha responded by saying, "born ready @Pitbull ...are u sure you can you handle this wild child?" After exchanging a couple more tweets about having a party on the dance floor and having a "pants off dance off", the conversation escalated when Pitbull asked Kesha, ".@keshasuxx Well what's going on this summer?  Maybe we should hang out… and party". Kesha then responded by saying, "you know me and my #Animals would love that @Pitbull", which hinted at the tour, which was announced the next day.

Members of both Kesha's and Pitbull's fanclubs got a first chance at purchasing tickets for the tour on March 27, 2013, before the general public got a chance to purchase the tickets on March 29, 2013. Various local top 40 radio stations have been giving tickets away to promote the tour. MTV has also been promoting the tour due to the fact that Kesha's reality show, Kesha: My Crazy Beautiful Life, is being aired on the broadcasting station as its first season. To promote the tour even more, the pair teamed up for a remix of Kesha's latest single, "Crazy Kids".

On August 5, 2013 the duo announced that they would take the tour to Australia in late October and early November. The pre-sale for the tickets began on August 7, 2013 and ended on August 11, 2013, unless the pre-sale tickets sold out before then. The tickets for the pre-sale were only available to Visa Credit, Debit and Prepaid cardholders. The tickets became available to the general public on August 15, 2013. It was also announced on the 5th that the Justice Crew would join them as they traveled their way around Australia. Stops on the tour included Brisbane, Melbourne, Adelaide, Perth and Sydney.

On October 14, 2013, it was announced that the duo's Australian leg of the tour had been cancelled by the promoter due to low ticket sales. Just two weeks before they were set to take the stage in Australia, the duo had cancelled their tour, but after the statement was released both artists released their condolences to the fans.

Broadcasts and recordings
On June 21, 2013, the television network, E!, announced that the network would broadcast the tour on their network as a part of E!'s Inside Track Summer Concert Series. The series is a collaboration with Live Nation. The network filmed the show in Detroit at The Palace of Auburn Hills on June 7, 2013. The recording was aired as the first installment of the series on June 21, 2013. To promote the broadcasting, E! interviewed Kesha an hour before the show at The Palace of Auburn Hills. In the interview, Kesha conversed with the interviewer about her favorite and least favorite parts of the tour, costumes she wears for the tour, and her golden tooth that she has from an accident at a bar. E! also interviewed Kesha's stage manager, Justin De Meulenaere, before the show. Meulenaere, who is also known as "Boot", is most known for his work with Kesha on her previous concert tour, the Get Sleazy Tour.

Setlist
{{hidden
| headercss = background: #ccccff; font-size: 100%; width: 65%;
| contentcss = text-align: left; font-size: 100%; width: 75%;
| header = Kesha
| content =
"Warrior"
"Crazy Kids" 
"We R Who We R"
"Blow"
"Gold Trans Am"
"Dirty Love"
"Take It Off"
"C'Mon"
"Last Goodbye"
"Machine Gun Love"
"Blah Blah Blah"
"Your Love Is My Drug"
"Tik Tok"
Encore
"Die Young"
}}

{{hidden
| headercss = background: #ccccff; font-size: 100%; width: 65%;
| contentcss = text-align: left; font-size: 100%; width: 75%;
| header = Pitbull
| content =	
"Hey Baby (Drop It to the Floor)"
"International Love"
"I Like How It Feels" / "Dance Again" / "Move Shake Drop"
"Shut It Down"
"Live It Up" / "Get It Started"
"Rain Over Me" / "Throw Your Hands Up (Dancar Kuduro)" / "Echa Pa'lla (Manos Pa'rriba)" / "Bon, Bon"
"Back in Time"
"Don't Stop the Party"	
"Crazy People" / "Shake Señora" / "Shake (Mentirosa)"
"Culo"
"I Know You Want Me (Calle Ocho)"
"On the Floor" / "I Like It" / "DJ Got Us Fallin' in Love"
"Hotel Room Service"
Encore
"Feel This Moment"
"Give Me Everything"
}}

Tour dates

Cancellations and rescheduled shows

Box office score data

References

2013 concert tours
Co-headlining concert tours
Kesha concert tours
Pitbull (rapper) concert tours
Concert tours of Canada
Concert tours of the United States